Andrey Golubev successfully defended his last year's title. He defeated Illya Marchenko 6–3, 6–3 in the final match.

Seeds

Draw

Finals

Top half

Bottom half

References
 Main Draw
 Qualifying Draw

President's Cup - Singles
2009 Singles